Svend Evensen (30 December 1880  – ) was a Norwegian judge.

He was born in Vestby to merchant Ole Evensen and Cathinca Soelberg. He graduated as cand.jur. in 1905, and was named as a Supreme Court Justice from 1933.

References

1880 births
Year of death missing
People from Vestby
Supreme Court of Norway justices